The Vilnius St. Joseph Seminary is a Roman Catholic seminary in Vilnius, Lithuania. It traces its history to an institution founded by Cardinal Jurgis Radvila in 1582. After being closed and reopened several times, it was re-established in 1993 by Juozas Bačkis, the archbishop of Vilnius, and moved to a new building in 1997.

The seminary prepares candidates for priesthood in the Vilnius Archdiocese and the dioceses of Panevėžys and Kaišiadorys. Over the course of the six-year programme, candidates study philosophy, theology, sociology, church history and teachings, educational theory, singing, psychology, languages, art history, and rhetoric. Its graduates receive a baccalaureate from the Pontifical Lateran University.

References

External links
 Official website

Universities and colleges in Vilnius
Catholic seminaries in Lithuania
1582 establishments in Europe
Educational institutions established in the 1580s